The Douglas Building is a building in southeast Portland, Oregon listed on the National Register of Historic Places.

Further reading

See also
 National Register of Historic Places listings in Southeast Portland, Oregon

References

External links
 

1929 establishments in Oregon
Buildings and structures completed in 1929
Portland Eastside MPS
Sunnyside, Portland, Oregon
Portland Historic Landmarks